Norman "Latchem" Robinson (17 October 1900 – 18 March 1980) was an Australian professional rugby league footballer, coach, selector and club administrator for the Balmain Tigers club in Sydney and a City, State and National selector and manager. He also served as NSW and Australian coach in 1948 and 1958 respectively.

Playing career
Robinson was graded at Balmain in 1922 as a halfback. He was a member of the Balmain Tigers team that won the Premiership in the 1924 NSWRFL season. Robinson was selected in the New South Wales rugby league team between 1925 and 1926, playing a total of 5 games for the Blues. He played in the Maher Cup for Cootamundra in 1928, gaining representative selection for Southern Division in a match against Great Britain. Robinson then returned to Sydney and continued playing for Balmain. The final years of his career were spent playing for Yanco's club.

Coaching career
Robinson had three separate coaching spells with the Balmain club. He coached the Balmain Tigers in 1930, 1944, 1945, 1946, 1947, 1954, 1955 and 1956 before retiring.  He was coach of New South Wales in 1948. Also, in 1953, he coached the American "All Stars" during their tour of Australia. He was manager of the Australian team in the 1957 Rugby League World Cup.  He was appointed coach of the Australian team for the 1958 Ashes series against the touring Great Britain Lions. The British won the series 2–1 after winning Game 2 in Brisbane and Game 3 in Sydney.

Administrative career
Robinson was for many years after his playing retirement a Secretary-Manager of the Balmain Leagues Club. Together with the St George administrator Snowy Justice, Robinson's former representative playing peer, he was one of the seminal forces behind the establishment of the Club Managers' Association of Australia at its foundation in 1964. Robinson was awarded a Life Membership of that organisation for outstanding service to the club industry.

Accolades
The Wests Tigers Team of the Century was announced in 2004, encompassing the best players from both Balmain and Western Suburbs. Norm Robinson was voted the Coach of the Century.

The "Latchem" Robinson stand at Leichhardt Oval, Balmain's home ground, is named in his honour. Norm Robinson died 12 days before the opening of the stand by Neville Wran, premier of New South Wales and Tiger supporter, in 1980.

His largely attended funeral was held at St. Thomas's Church, Rozelle, New South Wales on 21 March 1980 and he was cremated at Northern Suburbs Crematorium.

References

Sources

Footnotes

External links
Norm Robinson at NRL Stats
The History of the Balmain Tigers

1900 births
1980 deaths
Australia national rugby league team coaches
Australian rugby league administrators
Australian rugby league coaches
Australian rugby league players
Balmain Tigers coaches
Balmain Tigers players
New South Wales rugby league team coaches
New South Wales rugby league team players
Rugby league halfbacks
Rugby league players from Sydney
United States national rugby league team coaches